KGTV Tower is a  self-support Ideco Dresser television tower in La Jolla, California, United States.

History

KGTV Tower (originally KFSD-TV tower, later KOGO-TV) was built in 1953, by then owner Thomas Sharp (founder of Sharp Healthcare). The main tower is also identical (although shorter) to former sister station KFSD/KOGO AM 600's twin 416 foot Ideco Dresser towers.

Radio Stations on KGTV Tower

The main tower is also home of the ERI combined FM antenna containing KMYI, KYXY, KSON and KIOZ.

Also at the site is a custom built "H" shaped tower used for microwave, and also serves as the main tower for KSSX.

KMYI (formerly KFSD-FM/KOGO-FM) moved to the KGTV site in 1974 from the Emerald Hills KOGO 600 facility.
KSSX moved to the KGTV site from the lower Soledad site of UCSD in 2007.
KYXY moved to the KGTV site in 2007 from the KFMB Channel 8 tower site.
KSON (originally KSDO-FM) was licensed to the site in the early 1960s.
KIOZ moved to the KGTV site in 1999 from the KFMB Channel 8 tower site.

KGTV and the Mount Soledad transmitter site are presently owned by Scripps Broadcasting.

See also
List of masts
KGTV

External links
 

Towers completed in 1953
Towers in California
Radio masts and towers in the United States
1953 establishments in California
Buildings and structures in San Diego
La Jolla, San Diego